Petros Mhari (born 15 April 1989) is a Zimbabwean professional footballer who plays as a goalkeeper for the Zimbabwean club F.C. Platinum, and the Zimbabwe national team.

Career
Mhari went to a sports school in Shangani Secondary school, and originally played as a midfielder. He was forced to play handball in school due to a shortage of interested students, but from there learned skills that translated to the goalkeeper position in football. He began his senior career as a goalkeeper with Shabanie Mine, before moving to Hwange Colliery in 2009. In 2013, he moved to F.C. Platinum where he helped his side win 3 consecutive Zimbabwe Premier Soccer League titles from 2017 to 2019.

International career
Mhari made his international debut with the Zimbabwe national team in a 1–0 2022 FIFA World Cup qualification loss to South Africa on 11 November 2021. He was part of the Zimbabwe squad the 2021 Africa Cup of Nations.

Honours
F.C. Platinum
Cup of Zimbabwe: 2014
Zimbabwe Premier Soccer League: 2017, 2018, 2019

References

External links
 
 

1989 births
Living people
People from Matabeleland South Province
Zimbabwean footballers
Zimbabwe international footballers
Zimbabwe Premier Soccer League players
Association football goalkeepers
2021 Africa Cup of Nations players
Shabanie Mine F.C. players
Hwange Colliery F.C. players
F.C. Platinum players